Westfield Farm Chalk Bank is a  biological Site of Special Scientific Interest  west of East Garston in Berkshire.

Geography

The site is lowland Calcareous grassland The bank is North facing. There is access by a footpath from Newbury Road.

Flora

The site has the following Flora:

Bromus erectus
Brachypodium pinnatum
Lolium perenne
Cynosurus cristatus
Scabiosa columbaria
Linum catharticum
Thymus praecox
Cirsium acaule
Carex flacca
Gentianella amarella
Knautia arvensis
Primula veris
Anthyllis vulneraria
Galium verum
Briza media
Ononis repens
Sanguisorba minor
Plantago media
Campanula glomerata
Koeleria macrantha
Trifolium medium
Dactylorhiza fuchsii
Listera ovata
Anacamptis pyramidalis
Coeloglossum viride
Platanthera  chlorantha

References

Sites of Special Scientific Interest in Berkshire